Mr. Manaivi or Mister Manaivi  is an 2023 Indian Tamil-language television series which will premiere on 6th March 2023 in Sun TV, and is available for worldwide streaming on Sun NXT. 
The series stars starring Shabana Shajahan, and Pavan Ravindra in lead roles

Synopsis
The story around the newly married couple as they face challenges and problems in their daily routine life. Anjali, a strong and independent woman, manages her life on her own, while Vicky, who aspires to be Mr. Homemaker (Mr. Manaivi), becomes entangled. The main plot point is this.

Cast

Main
 Shabana Shajahan as Anjali
 Pavan Ravindra as Vicky (Mr. Manaivi)

Recurring
 Anuradha as Ranjitham
 Latha as Maragatham
 Maansi Joshi as Swetha
 VJ Aswath as Naresh
 Sanjay Kumar Asrani as Raja
 Ammu Ramachandran as Saranya
 Rajkanth as Chandramohan
 Jenny
 Punitha Balakrishnan as Viji
 Kuruvi Tamil

Production

Development 
On end 2022, Sun Network confirmed through a press release that it would distribute new Tamil serial, to be produced by Vision Time. Initially, the title of the serial was named Jodi. Later renamed as Mr.Manaivi.

Casting
Shabana Shajahan was cast in the female lead role as Anjali.  newcomer Pavan Ravindra plays the title role alongside her.

Release
The first promo was released on 20 February 2023, in which we see the protagonist, two grandmothers in a temple talking about their grandchildren.

The show started airing on Sun TV on 6 March 2023 From Monday to Saturday replacing Kannana Kanne.

Original soundtrack

Title song
It was written by P. Vijay. It was sung by Sridhar Ramesh and M.M Monisha.

Soundtrack

References

External links
 

Sun TV original programming
Tamil-language romance television series
2023 Tamil-language television series debuts
Television shows set in Tamil Nadu
Tamil-language television soap operas